Man About the House is a British sitcom created by Brian Cooke and Johnnie Mortimer that starred Richard O'Sullivan, Paula Wilcox, Sally Thomsett, Yootha Joyce and Brian Murphy. Six series were broadcast on ITV from 15 August 1973 to 7 April 1976. The series was considered daring at the time because it featured a man sharing a London flat with two single women. The show was made by Thames Television and recorded at its Teddington studio in Greater London. It is regularly repeated on ITV3.

Two spin-off series were later made: George and Mildred and Robin's Nest. In 2004, Man About the House placed 69th in a poll to find Britain's Best Sitcom. The series was remade in the United States as Three's Company in 1977. A film version was released in 1974.

Cast

Main stars
 Richard O'Sullivan as Robin Tripp
 Paula Wilcox as Chrissy Plummer
 Sally Thomsett as Jo

Co-stars
 Yootha Joyce as Mildred Roper
 Brian Murphy as George Roper
 Doug Fisher as Larry Simmonds

Recurring cast
 Roy Kinnear as Jerry (series 3 to 5)
 Daphne Oxenford as Mrs Plummer (series 1, 4 and 6)

Plot
Chrissy and Jo live in a London flat together and work for the same firm. The women find a stranger, student chef Robin Tripp, asleep in their bath the morning after the farewell party for their departed flatmate Eleanor. When he meets the two girls, Robin has been in London two days, having moved from Southampton to attend University. The girls are unimpressed with Gabrielle (Helen Fraser) as a potential replacement for Eleanor, but they are impressed by Robin's culinary skills, as they cannot cook at all. Learning that Robin has been staying at the YMCA, they convince him to move in, on the understanding that it will be a platonic relationship.

Chrissy tells landlord George Roper that Robin is gay to eliminate George's objections to the mixed-sex living arrangement. George, in truth a subletting landlord placed by the council, is a miserly, spiteful and unkempt man under the thumb of his domineering and sexually frustrated wife Mildred.

In the second episode, Robin's true sexuality becomes known to Mildred. She takes out her frustrations with George's lack of class and sexual inadequacy by making suggestive remarks to Robin and frequently siding with the tenants against George. Mildred openly flirts with Robin, and Robin frequently flirts with Chrissy and Jo. The girls, adhering to their pledge to maintain a platonic relationship with Robin, spurn his mild advances and adapt to his presence in the flat. Chrissy occasionally shows attraction to Robin, but the two never pursue any romantic interaction.

Robin's friend Larry, a lovable rogue, appears on a recurring basis throughout the series. In the third series, he moves into the loft apartment above the trio's apartment and is a frequent source of trouble. Another occasional cast member is George's friend, the dodgy builder Jerry (Roy Kinnear). Jerry is the only supporting character to reappear in the spin-off George and Mildred.

Robin's brother Norman Tripp (Norman Eshley) appears in the final three episodes of the sixth and final series, and starts a romance with Chrissy. Eshley had a previous guest role in the episode "In Praise of Older Men" (Series 2, Episode 3).

Episodes

First airing on 15 August 1973, Man About the House ran until 7 April 1976, spanning 39 episodes in six series. In addition, on Christmas Day 1973, a short special aired as part of All-star Comedy Carnival.

Theme music
Written by Johnny Hawksworth and entitled "Up to Date", the theme song was not specially commissioned for the show, but rather was provided via the production music company De Wolfe Music. It also appeared on the 1996 compilation CD The Sound Gallery – Volume Two, but credited to the Simon Park Orchestra.

Film

A 1974 film version of the show starred all of the main cast members. It was the last in a series of movie screen adaptations of popular TV shows made by Hammer Films, though a George and Mildred film (featuring Yootha Joyce and Brian Murphy) would be made in 1980 by another studio.

Spin-offs and remakes

After the series ended in 1976, two successful spin-off series followed:

 George and Mildred, in which the Ropers move to the suburbs.
 Robin's Nest, in which Robin gets married and opens a bistro.

The format of Man About the House was sold internationally, and it was remade in the United States as Three's Company in 1976; in the Netherlands as Sam Sam in 1994; in Sweden as En fyra för tre in 1996; in Norway as Tre på toppen in 1997; in Portugal as Não Há Duas Sem Três in 1997; in Poland as Lokatorzy in 2000; in Russia as Troe sverhy in 2006; in Ecuador as El hombre de la casa and in Chile as Tres son multitud, both in 2007.

The American Three's Company adaptation also spawned the same spin-offs as had Man About the House: Three's a Crowd (based on Robin's Nest) and The Ropers (based upon George and Mildred).

Home media
All six series have been released on DVD in the UK by Network DVD, as have George and Mildred and Robin's Nest.

Region 2 Releases:
 Series 1 - 2005 (reissued on 8 April 2013)
 Series 2–30 January 2006
 Series 3–20 March 2006
 Series 4–7 August 2006
 Series 5–22 January 2007
 Series 6–14 May 2007
 The Complete Series (Features the six individual seasons in a box) - 24 September 2007
 The Complete Series (In slimmer packaging) - 26 May 2008

Series 1 and 2 have had a US release as part of a two-disc set by FremantleMedia.

Series 1 and 2 were released in Australia in 2004, but a delay was encountered in releasing further series because of contract renegotiations (the same problem affected releases of George and Mildred and Bless This House). Series 3 was finally released on 16 July 2008, and Series 4 on 5 November 2008. Series 5 and 6 are yet to be released. Series 1 was re-released on 2 April 2009, now with the same cover art as the UK edition. Fremantle Media re-released series 1 on 3 March 2011 with new cover art. Re-releases have continued with Series 2 on 3 October 2012, Series 3 on 1 May 2013, and Series 4 on 1 May 2013. Series 5 and Series 6 finally received a release on 7 August 2013. Via Vision Entertainment announced "The Complete Series" will be released on October 21, 2020, which will be the first time this series will be released as a collection.

In 2019, a 19-disc DVD set (Region 2) was issued by Network/Fremantle containing every episode of Man About the House, George and Mildred and Robin's Nest.

See also
 List of films based on British sitcoms

References

External links
 .
 .
 Man about the house – George and Mildred book at Publisher's website.

 
1973 British television series debuts
1976 British television series endings
1970s British sitcoms
1970s sex comedy television series
English-language television shows
ITV sitcoms
Television shows produced by Thames Television
Television shows adapted into films
Television series by Fremantle (company)
Television shows set in London
Television shows shot at Teddington Studios